Manoj Kumar Paras is an Indian politician and a member of the 16th Legislative Assembly of Uttar Pradesh of India. He represents the Nagina constituency of Uttar Pradesh and is a member of the Samajwadi Party political party.

Personal life
Paras was born on 14 June 1967 to Amar Singh 'Ravi' in Binzhahed, Bijnor district, Uttar Pradesh. After completing intermediate education, Paras enrolled in the Bachelor of Arts degree in Garhwal University, Uttarakhand, but dropped out completing the first year. Paras married Neelam Singh Paras on 17 April 1994, which whom he has a son. He is an agriculturist by profession.

Political career
Manoj Kumar Paras has been a MLA for two terms. He represents the Nagina constituency and is a member of the Samajwadi Party political party. Paras was also a minister in the Government of Uttar Pradesh. On 9 March 2014, Paras was sacked (as minister) by Akhilesh Yadav on grounds of "anti-party activities".

In 2017 elections he defeated Bhartiya Janata Party candidate Omwati Devi by a margin of 7,967 votes.

Posts held

See also
Nagina
Uttar Pradesh Legislative Assembly
Government of India
Politics of India
Samajwadi Party

References 

Samajwadi Party politicians
Uttar Pradesh MLAs 2012–2017
Uttar Pradesh MLAs 2017–2022
People from Bijnor district
1967 births
Living people